The following outline is provided as an overview of and topical guide to bridges:

Bridges – a structure built to span physical obstacles without closing the way underneath such as a body of water, valley, or road, for the purpose of providing passage over the obstacle.

What type of thing is a bridge? 

Bridges can be described as all of the following:
 A structure – An arrangement and organization of interrelated elements in a material object or system, or the object or system so organized.
 A thoroughfare – A road connecting one location to another.

Types of bridges 
Beam Bridge
Truss Bridge
Truss arch bridge
Cantilever Bridge
Stressed ribbon bridge
Arch Bridge
Tied Arch Bridge
Through arch bridge
Skew arch
Suspension Bridge
Cable-stayed bridge
Simple suspension bridge
Inca rope bridge
Tubular bridge
Extradosed bridge
Moveable Bridge
Drawbridge (British English definition) – the bridge deck is hinged on one end
Bascule bridge – a drawbridge hinged on pins with a counterweight to facilitate raising ; road or rail
Rolling bascule bridge – an unhinged drawbridge lifted by the rolling of a large gear segment along a horizontal rack
Folding bridge – a drawbridge with multiple sections that collapse together horizontally
Curling bridge – a drawbridge with transverse divisions between multiple sections that curl vertically
Fan Bridge - a drawbridge with longitudinal divisions between multiple bascule sections that rise to various angles of elevation, forming a fan arrangement.
Vertical-lift bridge – the bridge deck is lifted by counterweighted cables mounted on towers ; road or rail
Table bridge – a lift bridge with the lifting mechanism mounted underneath it
Retractable bridge (Thrust bridge) – the bridge deck is retracted to one side
Submersible bridge – also called a ducking bridge, the bridge deck is lowered into the water
Tilt bridge – the bridge deck, which is curved and pivoted at each end, is lifted at an angle
Swing bridge – the bridge deck rotates around a fixed point, usually at the centre, but may resemble a gate in its operation ; road or rail
Transporter bridge – a structure high above carries a suspended, ferry-like structure
Jet bridge – a passenger bridge to an airplane. One end is mobile with height, yaw, and tilt adjustments on the outboard end
Guthrie rolling bridge
Vlotbrug, a design of retractable floating bridge in the Netherlands
Locks are implicitly bridges as well allowing ship traffic to flow when open and at least foot traffic on top when closed
Rigid-frame bridge
Side-spar cable-stayed bridge
Segmental bridge
Multi-Level Bridges
Viaduct
Vierendeel bridge
Toll bridge
Footbridge
Clapper bridge
Moon bridge
Step-stone bridge
Zig-zag bridge
Plank
Boardwalk
Joist
Multi-way bridge
Three-Way Bridge
Four-Way Bridge
Five-Way Bridge
Trestle bridge
Coal trestle
Transporter bridge
Log bridge
Packhorse bridge
Aqueduct

Military Bridges

 AM 50
 Armoured vehicle-launched bridge
 Bailey bridge
 Callender-Hamilton bridge
 Mabey Logistic Support Bridge
 Medium Girder Bridge
 Pontoon bridge

History of bridges 

History of bridges

General bridges concepts 
Bending The behavior of a slender structural element subjected to an external load applied perpendicularly to a longitudinal axis of the element.
Compression (physics) The application of balanced inward ("pushing") forces to different points on a material or structure, that is, forces with no net sum or torque directed so as to reduce its size in one or more directions.
Shear stress The component of stress coplanar with a material cross section.
Span (engineering) The distance between two intermediate supports for a structure.
Tension (physics) The pulling force transmitted axially by the means of a string, cable, chain, or similar one-dimensional continuous object, or by each end of a rod, truss member, or similar three-dimensional object; tension might also be described as the action-reaction pair of forces acting at each end of said elements.
Torsion (mechanics) The twisting of an object due to an applied torque.
Torque The rate of change of angular momentum of an object.

Bridges companies 
Alabama Department of Transportation (ALDOT)
Alaska Department of Transportation and Public Facilities (DOT&PF)
Arizona Department of Transportation (ADOT)
Arkansas State Highway and Transportation Department (AHTD)
California Department of Transportation (Caltrans)
Colorado Department of Transportation (CDOT)
Connecticut Department of Transportation (CONNDOT)
Delaware Department of Transportation (DelDOT)
Florida Department of Transportation (FDOT)
Georgia Department of Transportation (GDOT)
Hawaii Department of Transportation (HDOT)
Idaho Transportation Department (ITD)
Illinois Department of Transportation (IDOT)
Indiana Department of Transportation (INDOT)
Iowa Department of Transportation (Iowa DOT)
Kansas Department of Transportation (KDOT)
Kentucky Transportation Cabinet (KYTC)
Louisiana Department of Transportation and Development (DOTD)
Maine Department of Transportation (MaineDOT)
Maryland Department of Transportation (MDOT)
Massachusetts Department of Transportation (MassDOT)
Michigan Department of Transportation (MDOT)
Minnesota Department of Transportation (Mn/DOT)
Mississippi Department of Transportation (MDOT)
Missouri Department of Transportation (MoDOT)
Montana Department of Transportation (MDT)
Nebraska Department of Transportation (NDOT) 
Nevada Department of Transportation (NDOT)
New Hampshire Department of Transportation (NHDOT)
New Jersey Department of Transportation (NJDOT)
New Mexico Department of Transportation (NMDOT)
New York
New York State Bridge Authority
New York State Department of Transportation (NYSDOT)
New York State Thruway Authority (NYSTA)
North Carolina Department of Transportation (NCDOT)
North Dakota Department of Transportation (NDDOT)
Ohio Department of Transportation (ODOT)
Oklahoma Department of Transportation (ODOT)
Oregon Department of Transportation (ODOT)
Pennsylvania Department of Transportation (PennDOT)
Puerto Rico Department of Transportation and Public Works (DTOP)
Rhode Island Department of Transportation (RIDOT)
South Carolina Department of Transportation (SCDOT)
South Dakota Department of Transportation (SDDOT)
Tennessee Department of Transportation (TDOT)
Texas Department of Transportation (TxDOT)
Utah Department of Transportation (UDOT)
Vermont Agency of Transportation (VTrans)
Virginia Department of Transportation (VDOT)
Washington State Department of Transportation (WSDOT)
West Virginia Department of Transportation (WVDOT)
Wisconsin Department of Transportation (WisDOT)
Wyoming Department of Transportation (WYDOT)

Notable Bridges 
Akashi Kaikyō Bridge
Alcantara Bridge
Brooklyn Bridge
Chapel Bridge
Charles Bridge
Chengyang Bridge
Chesapeake Bay Bridge
Gateshead Millennium Bridge
George Washington Bridge
Golden Gate Bridge
Great Belt Bridge
Hangzhou Bay Bridge
Mackinac Bridge
Millau Viaduct
Ponte Vecchio
Rainbow Bridge (Niagara Falls)
Rialto Bridge
Royal Gorge Bridge
Seri Wawasan Bridge
Seven Mile Bridge
Stari Most
Sunshine Skyway Bridge
Sydney Harbour Bridge
Tacoma Narrows Bridges
The Confederation Bridge
The Helix Bridge
Tower Bridge
Verrazano-Narrows Bridge
Tsing Ma Bridge

See also 
List of bridges

References

External links 

Bridges
Bridges
Bridges